Junior Fabrice Sambu Mansoni (born 3 June 1996), or simply Fabrice Sambu, is a Belgian professional footballer who plays as a right-back for Belgian Pro League club Seraing.

Career 
Having played for CS Visé between 2013 and 2015, Sambu joined Seraing on a two-year contract on 23 April 2015. He joined URSL Visé on 30 August 2019, on a one-year contract with an option for an extra year. On 26 June 2020, Sambu moved to France, at Cholet.

On 24 June 2021, Sambu returned to Seraing.

Personal life
Born in France, Sambu is of Congolese and Angolan descent.

Notes

References 

1996 births
Living people
Footballers from Liège
Belgian footballers
Belgian people of Angolan descent
Belgian people of Democratic Republic of the Congo descent
Association football fullbacks
C.S. Visé players
R.F.C. Seraing (1922) players
URSL Visé players
SO Cholet players
Challenger Pro League players
Belgian Third Division players
Championnat National players
Belgian Pro League players
Belgian expatriate footballers
Belgian expatriate sportspeople in France
Expatriate footballers in France